Desideria Ocampo Arriola (1861 – April 9, 1910) was the wife of President Manuel Estrada Cabrera, and served as First Lady of Guatemala during his presidency. She was daughter of Gabriel Ocampo and María Encarnación Arriola  She died in France in April 1910. She had two children with the President Estrada Cabrera.

References

1861 births
1910 deaths
First ladies of Guatemala